Andreas Rudman (November 3, 1668 – September 17, 1708) was a pioneer Swedish-American Lutheran minister. He was pastor of Gloria Dei (Old Swedes') Church in Philadelphia.

Background
Anders Rudman was born in Gävle, Gästrikland Province, Sweden, the son of Johan Augustison Rudolph and Magdalena Nilsdotter. He was attended  the University of Uppsala and was ordained into the Church of Sweden. Rudman supervised the construction of Gloria Dei Church at Wicaco, Pennsylvania  beginning in 1698.
The church was dedicated in 1700. Rudman was succeeded as pastor at Gloria Dei by Anders Sandel in 1702. 
Rudman accepted a call to pastor at a Dutch Lutheran congregation in New York City  and later served two church congregations near Philadelphia.
Rudman died in 1708 and was buried in Gloria Dei.

References

Other sources
Hotchkin, Rev. S. F. Early Clergy of Pennsylvania and Delaware (Philadelphia, PA: P. W. Ziegler & Co. 1890)

External links
Gloria Dei (Old Swedes') Church
Holy Trinity (Old Swedes) Church
St. Gabriel's Church, Douglassville, PA

1668 births
1708 deaths
People from Gävle
17th-century American Lutheran clergy
Swedish emigrants to the United States
18th-century American Lutheran clergy
17th-century Swedish Lutheran priests
Uppsala University alumni
Burials at Gloria Dei (Old Swedes') Church
Church of Sweden clergymen in Colonial North America